The Order of the Star of Brabant was an order of merit, established on 14 June 1914 by Ernest Louis, Grand Duke of Hesse.  The order was founded in honour of Henry I, Landgrave of Hesse, founder of the House of Hesse. After the dissolution of the Grand Duchy in 1918 it was no longer awarded.

Classes  
The order was established in two divisions: male and female, with the following structure:

Male division:
 Grand Cross
 Grand Commander with Turquoises
 Grand Commander 1st and 2nd Class
 Commander 1st and 2nd Class
 Honour Cross 1st and 2nd Class
 Knight Cross 1st and 2nd Class
 Silver Cross 1st and 2nd Class
 Silver Medal

Female division:
 Dame of the Honour Cross 
 Dame of the 1st and 2nd Class
 Dame of the Silver Cross 
 Silver Medal

References
Jörg Nimmergut: Deutsche Orden und Ehrenzeichen bis 1945, Band I – Anhalt-Hohenzollern, Zentralstelle für wissenschaftliche Ordenskunde, München 1997, 

Orders, decorations, and medals of Hesse
Awards established in 1914